William Roy (1726–1790) was a Scottish military engineer, surveyor, and antiquarian.

William Roy may also refer to:

 William R. Roy (1926–2014), United States Representative from Kansas
 Bill Roy Jr. (born 1954), American member of the Kansas state legislature and son of William R. Roy
 William Roy (medium) (1911–1977), notorious fraud medium in the history of British spiritualism
 William Burton Roy (born 1958), retired USAF officer and Olympian sport shooter
 William F. Roy (1924–1991), Australian whistleblower